The 1903–04 RPI men's ice hockey season was the 3rd season of play for the program.

Season
After two years of trying, RPI won its first official game against Union College. After the third consecutive season of just one game the program was shuttered. It would return after two seasons.

Note: Rensselaer's athletic teams were unofficially known as 'Cherry and White' until 1921 when the Engineers moniker debuted for the men's basketball team.

Roster

Standings

Schedule and Results

|-
!colspan=12 style=";" | Regular Season

References

RPI Engineers men's ice hockey seasons
RPI
RPI
RPI
RPI